"White Wedding" is a song by Billy Idol that was released as the second single from his self-titled studio album in 1982. Although not Idol's highest-charting hit, it is often considered one of his most recognizable songs. In the US, it peaked at No. 10 on the Billboard Bubbling Under the Hot 100 chart on 27 November 1982, then reached No. 36 on the Billboard Hot 100 on 2 July 1983 after it was re-issued. In the UK, it reached No. 6 in the UK Singles Chart upon its re-release there in 1985, when it was re-issued to promote the Vital Idol remix album.

Cash Box called it "a powerful entry" whose "ominous guitar intro" and "accusatory tone" command attention.

1982 release

 7″: Chrysalis - CHS 2656 (UK)
 "White Wedding" (3:30)
 "Hole in the Wall" (4:14)

 12″: Chrysalis - CHS 12 2656 (UK)
 "White Wedding (Parts 1 and 2)" (8:20)
 "White Wedding" (3:30)
 "Hole in the Wall" (4:14)

 7″: Chrysalis - CHS 2648 (US)
 "White Wedding" (3:30)
 "Dead on Arrival" (3:54)

 12″: Chrysalis - EPC 5002 (US)
 "White Wedding (Parts 1 and 2)" (8:20)
 "White Wedding (Part 2)" (4:27)

1983 release

 12″: Chrysalis - 4V9 42685 (US)
 "White Wedding (Parts 1 and 2)" (8:20)
 "White Wedding (Part 2)" (4:27)

 7″: Chrysalis - CHS 42697 (US)
 "White Wedding" (3:30)
 "Dead on Arrival" (3:54)

1985 re-issue

 7″: Chrysalis - IDOL 5 (UK)
 "White Wedding" (3:30)
 "Mega-Idol Mix" (5:34)
 7" Mega-Idol comprises "Flesh For Fantasy" and "Hot in the City"

 12″: Chrysalis - IDOLX 5 (UK)
 "White Wedding Parts I & II (Shot Gun Mix)" (8:20)
 "Mega-Idol Mix" (7:50)
 12″ Mega-Idol comprises "Flesh For Fantasy," "Hot in the City" and "Dancing With Myself"

Music video
The music video, featuring Idol attending a goth wedding, is one of his best-known. The bride is played by Perri Lister, Idol's real-life girlfriend at the time. She is also one of the three dancers clad in black leather, who slap their buttocks in time with the clap track in the song as they shimmy downwards near the end. "That's the kind of thing they love in England", says Idol.

In one scene, Idol forces a wedding ring made of barbed wire onto Lister's finger and cuts her knuckle. Lister insisted that her knuckle actually be cut in order for the scene to appear more realistic. MTV initially removed this scene from the video. Also controversial were the apparent Nazi salutes made by the crowd toward the couple. Director David Mallet says he was merely "playing with the power of crowd imagery" when he had the extras reach toward the bride and did not realize how it looked until after it was filmed.

The MTV-edited version of the video is included on the DVD portion of The Very Best of Billy Idol: Idolize Yourself CD/DVD package.

Other versions and appearances
The song was featured in the 1998 film The Wedding Singer (in which Idol appears), on the American TV series My Name Is Earl and on the British TV series Blackpool. It was also featured in the 1993 film True Romance during the scene where Alabama is being tattooed. It was also featured in the skate videos CKY and Toy Machine's Jump Off A Building.

The line "It's a nice day to start again" was featured on the sticker on the front of Idol's 2005 album, Devil's Playground.

The song is used in the trailer for Bride of Chucky

The song is featured in the 1985 Italian horror film Demons.

The song was remixed as (Trashcan Jack vs Billy Idol) "Club Wedding" (Frenetic) under Digital Dog's Jack Rokka guise. It has appeared on numerous dance compilations such as Wild Bassline (CD2 Mixed by Brooklyn Bounce) and Clubland 12.

The song is included in the video games Rock Band 2, Rock Band Unplugged, Guitar Hero Van Halen, Marvel’s Guardians of the Galaxy, Grand Theft Auto: San Andreas and as DLC in Rocksmith.

The song was also used in an advertisement for British soap opera Hollyoaks, promoting the week of a wedding storyline. It also featured in an episode of the 2004 BBC miniseries Blackpool as part of the story.

The track also appeared on an advert for Coronation Street in 2003, promoting the climax of a bigamous storyline involving the character Peter Barlow. Barlow, portrayed by Chris Gascoyne, was seated at a table, reflectively spinning his two wedding rings around.

On The Colbert Report, a couple who had been prevented from wedding at the Jefferson Memorial, by the 2013 government shutdown, were married.  The couple shared their first dance as Audra McDonald sang the song.

A version sung in Greek by George Kostoglou appears in My Big Fat Greek Wedding 2.

The German heavy metal singer Doro Pesch featured a cover of "White Wedding" on her 2000 album Calling the Wild.

The American metal band In This Moment was set to collaborate with Idol on the track "Black Wedding" off their sixth album Ritual; the song's chorus contains the line, "it's a nice night for a black wedding," an obvious homage to Idol's "White Wedding." Due to claimed scheduling difficulties, Rob Halford of Judas Priest was featured on the track instead.

Slipknot drummer Joey Jordison's side project – the US horror punk band Murderdolls – reached number 24 on the UK Singles chart in 2003 with their cover of "White Wedding."

Deathstars made a version of White Wedding as a bonus track for their debut album Synthetic Generation. This version, played in A minor on instruments tuned down two whole steps, is a diminished fifth below the standard B minor version.

In the episode "Dyeing is Easy, Comedy is Hard" (S04E15) of Will & Grace (2002), Will Truman references this song when Elliot, Jack McFarland's son, appears with a short blond hair.

In the TV series “American Horror Story”, the song played in season 9, episode 2 of 1984, during the wedding massacre scene featuring Emma Roberts’ character.

The song was covered by Rowland S. Howard on his album "Teenage Snuff Film"

Alternative rock band Queens of the Stone Age album Era Vulgaris featured a cover of the song as a bonus track on two extended versions of the CD.

Charts

Weekly charts

Year end charts

Certifications

References

1982 singles
1982 songs
Billy Idol songs
Chrysalis Records singles
Music videos directed by David Mallet (director)
RPM Top Singles number-one singles
Song recordings produced by Keith Forsey
Songs about marriage
Songs written by Billy Idol